Neil Thomson Myles (17 June 1927 – 15 November 1993) was a Scottish professional footballer. During his career he made over 200 appearances for Ipswich Town between 1949 and 1960.

References

External links 

Neil Myles at Pride of Anglia

1927 births
1993 deaths
Footballers from Falkirk
Scottish footballers
Third Lanark A.C. players
Ipswich Town F.C. players
F.C. Clacton players
Association football wing halves
Scottish Football League players
English Football League players